Jay C. Flippen (March 6, 1899 – February 3, 1971) was an American character actor who often played crusty sergeants, police officers or weary criminals in many films of the 1940s and 1950s. Before his motion-picture career he was a leading vaudeville comedian and master of ceremonies.

Biography
Born on March 6, 1899, in Little Rock, Arkansas, Flippen was an established and respected vaudeville singer and stage actor before his film career. He was discovered by famed African-American comedian Bert Williams in 1920, and was Williams's Broadway understudy and tour replacement for the 1920 musical revue Broadway Brevities. He called himself "The Ham What Am", and his occasional blackface roles included those as Williams' replacement. Flippen attained the most coveted booking in vaudeville, headlining at the Palace Theatre in New York six times between March 1926 and February 1931.

At one time, he was a radio announcer for New York Yankees games and was one of the first game-show announcers. Between 1924 and 1929, Flippen recorded more than 30 songs for Columbia, Perfect, and Brunswick.

In 1928, Flippen proclaimed he would no longer perform in blackface. His first film, the 1928 Vitaphone short subject The Ham What Am, captures his vaudeville act, but not in blackface: he does a comedy monologue and finishes with a song. His Southern-drawl delivery may well be the same that he had used in blackface. Flippen became popular as a master of ceremonies on vaudeville bills, and emceed movie shorts in the 1930s.

When the Broadway stage revue Hellzapoppin became a success, its stars Olsen and Johnson decided to send the show on tour while they were playing it in New York. They hired Flippen to emcee the roadshow version, with comedian Happy Felton alongside him as a facsimile of Olsen and Johnson.

Flippen's film career started in earnest in 1947. Some of Flippen's most noteworthy film work came in support of James Stewart in five of the films the two made under the direction of Anthony Mann during the 1950s.  He gave notable supporting performances in three John Wayne films: as a humorous, larcenous Marine air-crew line chief in Flying Leathernecks (1951), as Wayne's commanding general in Jet Pilot (1957), and as a wheelchair-using senior partner of Wayne's in Hellfighters (1968).  He also made a fourth film that co-starred John Wayne (How the West Was Won, 1962), but played his only scene with Debbie Reynolds and Gregory Peck.

He appeared on television, including a 1960 guest-starring role as Gabe Jethrow in the episode "Four Came Quietly" on the CBS Western series Johnny Ringo, starring Don Durant. In 1962, he guest-starred on the ABC drama series Bus Stop as Mike Carmody in "Verdict of 12" and Follow the Sun as Fallon in "The Last of the Big Spenders". He also appeared on ABC's The Untouchables as Al Morrisey in "You Can't Pick the Number" (1959) and as Big Joe Holvak in "Fall Guy" (1962). In the 1962–63 season, Flippen was cast as Chief Petty Officer Homer Nelson on the NBC sitcom Ensign O'Toole, with Dean Jones in the starring role.

He guest-starred on CBS' The Dick Van Dyke Show in its first season, playing Rob Petrie's former mentor Happy Spangler. In 1964, he appeared as Owney in an episode of CBS' Gunsmoke with James Arness. In 1963, he guest-starred on Bonanza. He appeared four times on NBC's The Virginian in the 1960s; in 1966, he appeared on the ABC comedy Western The Rounders. In 1967, Tom Tryon and he guest-starred in the episode "Charade of Justice" of the NBC Western series The Road West.  After a leg amputation in 1965, Flippen continued acting, usually using a wheelchair, such as in his comeback role in a 1966 episode of The Virginian, and his 1967 guest appearance in Ironside (season one, "A Very Cool Hot Car").

Personal life
He was married for 25 years to screenwriter Ruth Brooks Flippen.

While filming Cat Ballou in 1965, he had to have a leg amputated due to a serious infection, originally resulting from a minor scrape with a car door, and likely complicated by diabetes.

Death
Flippen died February 3, 1971, aged 71, during surgery for an aneurysm of an artery, one month before his 72nd birthday. He was interred in a crypt in the Corridor of Memories section at Westwood Village Memorial Park Cemetery.

Selected filmography

Television

References

External links
 
 

1899 births
1971 deaths
20th-century American male actors
20th-century American singers
20th-century American male singers
American amputees
American game show hosts
American male film actors
American male radio actors
American male television actors
Burials at Westwood Village Memorial Park Cemetery
Major League Baseball broadcasters
Male actors from Little Rock, Arkansas
Male actors from Los Angeles
Male Western (genre) film actors
New York Yankees announcers
Vaudeville performers
Western (genre) television actors